The Gfallwand is a mountain in the Texel group of the Ötztal Alps. Parent peaks are the Zielspitze, Lahnbachspitze and Schwarze Wand. On the south side of the mountain is also a little lake, Pircher Lacke. The easiest route to the summit leads along the Ginggljoch.

Mountains of South Tyrol
Mountains of the Alps
Alpine three-thousanders
Ötztal Alps